This is a list of records and statistics achieved by the West Coast Eagles in the VFL/AFL from their debut in 1987.

All-time games table

End of 2019

Team records
Records listed only include matches played against other AFL teams in home and away or finals matches.

Key
 Achieved during the 2018 season

Scoring records

Individual records
Records listed only include players who played at least one game for the club.

Key

 Currently on the club's list.

Games records

Most games overall
G: games played

Goalkicking records

Most goals overall
G: Goals
B: Behinds

Most goals in a season

G: Goals
B: Behinds

 Cummings won the Coleman Medal in 1999, Kennedy won the award in 2015 and 2016.

Most goals in a match

G: Goals
B: Behinds

Statistics

Kicks

Handballs

Disposals

Marks

Tackles

Hit-outs

Physical records

Height
Height refers to the player's highest maximum or lowest minimum playing height:

Weight
Weight refers to the player's highest maximum or lowest minimum playing weight:

Age

References
West Coast statistics – AFL Tables.

Records
West Coast Eagles records
Australian rules football-related lists